Presidential elections were held in Guatemala between 10 and 12 November 1950. The result was a victory for Jacobo Arbenz Guzmán, who received 65.44% of the vote. Voter turnout was 71.6%.

Results

References

Bibliography
Villagrán Kramer, Francisco. Biografía política de Guatemala: años de guerra y años de paz. FLACSO-Guatemala, 2004. 
Political handbook of the world 1951. New York, 1952. 
Gleijeses, Piero. 1991. Shattered hope. The Guatemalan Revolution and the United States, 1944-1954. Princeton: Princeton University Press.
Rodríguez de Ita, Guadalupe. 2003. La participación política en la primavera guatemalteca: una aproximación a la historia de los partidos durante el periodo 1944-1954. México: Universidad Autónoma del Estado de México, Universidad Nacional Autónoma de México.

Presidential elections in Guatemala
Guatemala
President